San Pablo is a district of the San Pedro Department, Paraguay. It includes the village of San Pablo or San Pedro de Ycuamandiyú, which has a population of around 680, located around 330 km from the city of Asuncion.

On the river Jejui Guazú, is a small district of just over 4,000 inhabitants engaged in agriculture. Its soil is suitable for agriculture and in a great proportion for livestock, too.

Geography

The district of San Pablo, is located in the center of the department San Pedro, although the region was the victim of a process of rapid deforestation in the past, it includes one of the richest reserves of Forest that are very profitable. They attract exploitation and marketing force due to the forests.

In the region there are areas of agricultural use and low prairies that often flood.

Surface 

It has an area of 603 km², with a population of 4,351 inhabitants, and a population density of 7.22 people per square kilometer.

Ports

The district has the following ports: Puerto Tayi and Puerto La Niña, which are used to trade their agricultural production, and as a means of internal communication, which communicates with the districts in the area.

Communication 

This district is accessible by unpaved roads and internal roads that are also unpaved, being used as secondary rural roads. The embankment roads communicate all districts with each other and other national routes.

Currently, this district has public transport services between districts and regular services to the country's capital, in addition to Ciudad del Este Pedro Juan Caballero Brazil, Argentina and Chile.

Limits 

Limits:

To the north with the district of San Pedro de Ycuamandiyú, which separates the river Jejui Guazú.

To the south lies the district of Villa del Rosario.

To the east lies the district of Choré.

And to the west, the district of Antequera.

Hydrography 

There is the river Jejui Guazú, the least polluted of the country and with beautiful white sand beaches.

Climate 

The climate is predominantly rainy and humid. The relative humidity is 70 to 80%. The average is 23 °C; the highest in summer is 38 °C and at least 10 °C.

Education 

The district has elementary schools and high school level, in which children and young people attend regularly.

The illiteracy is due to extreme poverty which makes it difficult to send children to school, which particularly affects women. The indigenous tribes also have access to primary education but with little attendance.

The working population lacks a reasonable level of qualification, which conspires against the development of the area, so it does not have trained manpower.

Language

It predominates Guarani language which is spoken by about 80% of the inhabitants and the Castilian-Guarani (Jopara), spoken by 20% of the remaining population.

Demographics

Its rural population is 83.08% of the total population.

The total number of households in the district rises to the amount of 713, of which  143 of them  are in urban areas, and in rural areas there are 570, which represents the 79.94% of homes that are settled in rural areas.

According to the projection of the district's total population, by sex and by year,  it includes the following details:

 By 2010, the total population is of 4,403 inhabitants, of whom 2,354 are men and 2,050 are women.

In relation to the main socio-demographic indicators, this is the following:

 Population less than 15 year-old is 43.5%.
 Average of 3.6 children per woman.
 8.4% Illiteratation.
 Employed by the primary sector 67.6%.
 Employed by the secondary sector 6.3%.
 Employed in the tertiary sector 25.1%.
 Occupied work in the agricultural field 67.3%.
 Homes with electricity 78.4%.
 Homes with running water 41.0%.

Population 

The district of San Pablo has a population of 4,351 inhabitants, of whom 2,324 are male and 2,027 are women. In percentage terms, 53.3% are male and 46.6% women. 
  
It has enabled a colony by the IBR, currently INDERT, which has an area of 6,495 hectares and with an amount of 400 lots.

Economy 

It is one of the districts that has lower socio-economic indicators, however, in recent years there have been major advances, allowing the inhabitants to acquire a better quality of life.

In the district of San Pablo, a large percentage of the population is poor (77.9%); having a monthly average income per family of 408,487 Guarani, and 73,834 Guarani per person.

Its economy is essentially agricultural and it has increased considerably thanks to the fertility of its soil and the projects of creating new colonies. Its main agricultural products are: cotton,  tobacco, soybeans, mate, cassava, sunflower, sour orange and sweet orange.

Municipality 

The district of San Pablo’s current mayor is Mr. Quentin Bernardino Gonzalez Guerrero for the election period from 2006 to 2010.

Tourism 

The main tourist attraction of San Pablo are the beaches on the river Jejui Guazú, for their less polluted waters, which together with its white sand beaches make it a perfect place to cool and relax in the summer season.

Getting There  

Going from the city of Asuncion, Route II Marshal José Félix Estigarribia, to the city of Coronel Oviedo, then take the Route III General Elizardo Aquino up to the district of Choré, continue westward, about 35 kilometres to reach the district of San Pablo.

Bibliography 

 Publications of the weekly "Times of the world."
 Geography of Paraguay.
 Che Retâ Paraguay.
 Data from the DGEEC.
 ABC Color.
 Last minute.

Sources 
World Gazeteer: Paraguay – World-Gazetteer.com